This is a list of all the individuals that had been beatified by Pope John XXIII (r. 1958–1963) in his pontificate. The pope beatified 5 individuals.

See also
 Beatifications of Pope Pius XII
 List of people beatified by Pope Paul VI
 List of people beatified by Pope John Paul II
 List of people beatified by Pope Benedict XVI
 List of people beatified by Pope Francis

External links
 Hagiography Circle
 Patron Saints Index

Notes

 Later canonized on 9 December 1990.
 Later canonized on 14 September 1975.
 Later canonized on 15 May 2022.

Beatified by Pope John XXIII
John XXIII